Tosin Dosunmu (born 15 July 1980) is a Nigerian former professional footballer who played as a striker.

Club career
Dosunmu played for AS Nancy, KV Mechelen, K.V.C. Westerlo and Austria Wien. In the 2005–06 season, while he played for Beerschot, Dosunmu became top scorer in the Belgian First Division with 18 goals. His nickname is Cheadle due to his resemblance to the actor Don Cheadle.

International career
Dosunmu represented the Nigeria national team twice internationally.

References

1980 births
Living people
Sportspeople from Lagos
Nigerian footballers
Association football forwards
Nigeria international footballers
Yoruba sportspeople
First Bank F.C. players
FK Austria Wien players
AS Nancy Lorraine players
Ligue 1 players
S.V. Zulte Waregem players
K.V. Mechelen players
K.V.C. Westerlo players
Beerschot A.C. players
MVV Maastricht players
Royal Antwerp F.C. players
Sportkring Sint-Niklaas players
Belgian Pro League players
Challenger Pro League players
Austrian Football Bundesliga players
Eerste Divisie players
Nigerian expatriate footballers
Nigerian expatriate sportspeople in Belgium
Expatriate footballers in Belgium
Nigerian expatriate sportspeople in Austria
Expatriate footballers in Austria
Nigerian expatriate sportspeople in France
Expatriate footballers in France
Nigerian expatriate sportspeople in the Netherlands
Expatriate footballers in the Netherlands